Fiamma Nirenstein (born 18 December 1945 in Florence) is an Italian-Israeli journalist, author and politician. In 2008 she was elected to the Italian Parliament for Silvio Berlusconi's The People of Freedom party and she served as Vice President of the Committee on Foreign Affairs of the Chamber of Deputies for the length of the legislature, ending in March 2013. On 26 May 2013 she immigrated to Israel (made Aliyah). In 2015, Nirenstein was nominated by Israeli Prime Minister Benjamin Netanyahu as the future ambassador to Italy, but subsequently withdrew for what she stated were personal reasons. She is Senior Fellow of Jerusalem Center for Public Affairs (JCPA) and currently works there, at the Israeli-based think-tank of JPCA. She writes for the Italian right-wing daily Il Giornale and contributes articles in English to the Jewish News Syndicate. She is also on the Board of ISGAP and of the WJC.

She lives now in Jerusalem with frequent visits to Italy.

Background
Nirenstein's father, Alberto Nirenstein, came to Italy as part of the Jewish brigade. There he met his future wife Wanda Lattes, who was a partisan in the resistance. Nirenstein's parents, as distinguished journalists, were remembered in Italy with the title of the Borgo Allegri garden in Florence which in 2019 was called "Giardino Wanda Lattes and Alberto Nirenstein". She grew up in a Florentine Jewish family with different political views. She first visited Israel in 1966, and returned, taking up residence in the Neot Mordechai kibbutz  on the eve of the Six Day War, when Israel conquered the West Bank and the Gaza Strip. On her return to Italy she  joined the communist party and began her career as a journalist. In the debates that ensued in the wake of the Israeli invasion of Lebanon in 1982 - when Nirenstein signed a letter of protest - she found herself in disagreement with fellow communists who considered that Israel had become an occupying power.  She came round to the view that Israel had gained nothing from its withdrawal from that country. In 1993 and 1994 Nirenstein directed the Cultural Institute of the Italian Embassy in Tel Aviv.

Political career

In Italy
Silvio Berlusconi and his ally, Gianfranco Fini, the former leader of Alleanza Nazionale, Italy's conservative party, invited Nirenstein to become a candidate for their joint list Il Partito della Liberta ("The Party of Liberty") for the April 2008 national elections. During her campaign for a seat in Liguria, she did not talk at rallies about local issues, but rather concentrated on expounding her belief that Israel was in the vanguard of Western democracies in the battle against Islamic terrorism. In her view, the most important thing for Italians in grasping their national identity was to stand by the side of Israel. In general, through her political career, Nirenstein aimed to contribute to an anti-terrorist, pro-Israeli and Atlantic Alliance, which advocated the values of the culture of human rights.

Elected Member of the Italian Parliament, she served as Vice President of the Committee on Foreign Affairs of the Chamber of Deputies for the entire XVIth legislature, ending in March 2013. She was also a member of the Italian delegation to the Council of Europe, where she represented Italy in the Network for the fight against violence on children. Nirenstein also established and chaired the Committee for the Inquiry into Antisemitism of the Italian Parliament. During her parliamentary activity, she had a particular focus on Israel, human rights, international controversies, democratization in the Middle East and awareness of Iran's nuclear capabilities.

Among the most significant activities during her parliamentary activity there are the letter to the Ambassador of Syria in Italy, Khaddur Hasan, to stop the repression of the Assad regime, signed by 50 parliamentarians belonging to all political groups and various parliamentary questions including the question to the Foreign Affairs Committee of May 4, 2011 on the ongoing repression in Syria.

Professional career as journalist and writer
Nirenstein is an expert of the Middle East conflicts, terrorism, anti-Semitism, human rights and her activities deals with the great changes that are taking place within the Middle East democratization process. The pivotal focus and underlying idea that runs through all Fiamma Nirenstein's work is the fight against totalitarianism and terrorism as connected to antisemitism and hate for Israel.

Journalism
Nirenstein is a leading columnist for the conservative Italian daily "Il Giornale". From 1991 to 2006, she has been correspondent from Israel for "La Stampa" daily and the Berlusconi-owned "Panorama" weekly. She also wrote for the newspaper Grazia and was the founder of the monthly Rosa.

She is the author of thirteen books in Italian and seven in English. In Italy, Nirenstein has introduced and prefaced Bernard Lewis, Natan Sharansky and Ruthie Blum. She has been granted over twenty awards for her literary and journalistic activity.

Nirenstein started her career in 1977 and has been a columnist and correspondent for all major Italian magazines (Panorama; l'Espresso; Epoca). Nirenstein contributed to The New York Sun, to the Commentary magazine and has written for the Moment magazine.

Since 1998, she predicted the first terrorist threats in bin Laden's speeches and the suicide bombings of Islamic extremist.

Some of Nirenstein's work has been published in four American anthologies. Bernard Goldberg's  book "Bias" (Regency Publishing, 2002, pp. 200–206) quotes her extensively for the  view she writes well about the phenomenon of terrorism. A piece she wrote on the 9/11 disaster for Commentary magazine the day after the attack to explain the mentality of terrorists was subsequently quoted in The Wall Street Journal.

Fiamma Nirenstein has produced many documentaries for the Italian TV, the last by the title of "Settlers", about the disengagement from  Gaza seen from the perspective of the settlers themselves.  In 2006 she conceived and conducted a program on foreign affairs, "Ore diciotto/Mondo", on channel RAI 2. Radio Radicale has interviewed here for its "Il medio Oriente visto da Gerusalemme" program.

She has interviewed Rajiv Gandhi and met Deng Xiaoping, protagonists of the anti-communist regimes revolutions of the '80s, and in the area of the Israeli-Palestinian conflicts, Arafat, Sharon and Netanyahu.

Work at the Jerusalem Center for Public Affairs (JCPA) 
Fiamma Nirenstein began a working relationship with the Jerusalem Center for Public Affairs, an Israeli-based think-tank, in the late-2000s. Nirenstein's interests largely focus on European-Israeli relations, anti-Semitism, and sociological studies of terrorism. Nirenstein served both as an editor and contributor for her most recent publication, Lessons from Israel's Response to Terrorism. Within the publication, Nirenstein authored an article entitled "Resilience, the Israeli People's Weapon against Terror". In the essay, Nirenstein argues that Israelis have a unique culture built upon resilience which makes the country particularly strong in responding to terrorism.

In 2016, Nirenstein participated in an interview at the Jerusalem Center for Public Affairs on the subject of European Anti-Semitism. Among the subjects discussed include the history of anti-Semitism in Europe and its contemporary manifestations, particularly in what Nirenstein terms "Israelphobia".

One of her works produced while at the Israeli think-tank was Israel is Us: A Journalist's Odyssey in Understanding the Middle East. According to the organization's website, Nirenstein confesses the publication's premise is 'very simple': "Israel, contrary to commonly accepted propaganda, is a positive model, a case study for anyone who finds himself living in a democratic society that must eventually confront a defensive war- one that encompasses the entire universe of Western democracy today.”

Nirenstein continues to work at the think-tank.

Other publications 
Nirenstein's writings have also appeared, among other websites, on the Times of Israel, the Gatestone Institute and the Machiavelli Center for Political and Strategic Studies. Since 2007, she has also maintained her own personal website on which she publishes material in English and Italian. Today she is columnist for the Jewish News Syndicate.

Later political career

In August 2015, Benjamin Netanyahu designated Nirenstein to become Israel's ambassador to Italy. The initial reaction by the Jewish community of Rome was uneven, in fact after some negative reactions that emerged among the Italian Jewish community after the nomination, numerous reactions and declarations in favor of Nirenstein arrived from both Italy and Israel. Subsequently, Nirenstein withdrew from the offer for what she stated were personal reasons. Some press sources said the decision was related to her having called Sara Netanyahu a 'babau' in 1996, but other news sources confirmed that the decision to withdraw was for personal reasons.

Internationally

On June 29, 2011, Nirenstein was unanimously elected chairperson of the International Council of Jewish Parliamentarians (ICJP), an organization that brings together Jewish legislators, parliamentarians and government ministers from around the world.

In the same year, she established a center on Foreign Policy, "SUMMIT - for the dialogue between Europe and Middle East, human rights and democracy", with which she organized tens of events and conferences.

Nirenstein is a Selection Committee Member of the Genesis Prize, a fellow of the Jerusalem Center for Public Affairs and of the Gatestone Institute, as well as a member of the advisory board of Ngo-Monitor and a board member of the European Friends of Israel (EFI). She is also one of the six founding members of the steering committee of the Interparliamentary Coalition on Combating Antisemitism (ICCA), and in the board of the Friends of Israel Initiative, established on 2010 by former Prime Minister of Spain José María Aznar. She is also a board member of the "Talmud Project", a major initiative, sponsored by the Italian government, to translate the Babylonian Talmud into Italian.

Nirenstein has been dedicating a great effort in voicing for Muslim dissidents. In December 2007 she promoted and organized in Rome the international conference "Fighting for Democracy in the Islamic World", which was the continuation of the great Prague conference on dissidents, promoted by Natan Sharansky, Václav Havel and José María Aznar in June the same year.

Fight against Antisemitism and anti-Zionism

Fiamma Nirenstein has discussed antisemitism, anti-Zionism and the left. She has been official speaker in a variety of conferences on antisemitism, among them, the world forum of OCSE in Berlin about antisemitism, the Boston Conference on "antisemitism, the press and Europe" (2004), "Multiculturalism, the left and antisemitism" during the 2006 international symposium of the Vidal Sassoon Center (SICSA) at the Hebrew University of Jerusalem. In the 2014 SICSA international symposium, she raised the issue of fighting what she deemed to be "Israelophobia" as a means of beating contemporary antisemitism.

Political awards
 On 16 December 2009 Nirenstein, together with the other members of the ICCA steering committee, was awarded by the Israeli Knesset for her commitment in the fight against Antisemitism.
 In April 2011, she was awarded in New York by CAMERA, together with José Maria Aznar and John Bolton, for her activity as "Friend of Israel".
 In June 2011, Nirenstein was included in the Jerusalem Post list of the 50 most influential Jews in the world, headed by Mark Zuckerberg.

In an interview with Haaretz, Nirenstein stated that her country of origin, Italy, had much to learn about democracy from Israel. She also made the following assertions:-
"Every Jew in the world is an Israeli even if he's not aware of it. Anyone who doesn't know it is making a big mistake."
"...morally speaking, there mustn't be negotiations with Hamas, which thinks that Jews are the sons of monkeys and pigs. You can't negotiate with cannibals, who eat human beings." 
"I'm not saying that all Muslims are terrorists, or that all Muslims are criminals. But Hamas has announced that it wants to conquer Rome, to make it the outpost from which it will conquer all of Europe.".

Bibliography
In Israele (2018), Il Giornale. 
Le 12 bugie su Israele, (2016) Il Giornale.
Il Califfo e l'Ayatollah, (2015) Mondadori.
A Gerusalemme (2012)Rizzoli.  The history of Jerusalem through the eyes of twenty years of journalistic work
Israele Siamo Noi (2007) Rizzoli.  On the State of Israel as archetype for a liberal democracy at war with terror. - Translated into English: Israel is us - a personal odyssey to a journalist's understanding of the Middle East, JCPA ed., 2009
La Sabbia di Gaza (2006) Rubbettino editore. On the Israeli disengagement from Gaza.
Terror: The New Anti-Semitism and the War Against the West (2005) Smith and Kraus, Hannover, Usa.  An English-language selection of various articles.
Gli Antisemiti Progressisti (2004), Rizzoli. A look at the new anti-Semitism.
Islam, la guerra e la speranza (2003)  An interview with Bernard Lewis, Rizzoli.
L'Abbandono, come l'Occidente ha tradito gli ebrei (2002) Rizzoli. A book that argues the West has betrayed the Jewish people.
Un solo Dio, tre verità (2001) Mondadori .(One god, three truths) written with Giorgio Montefoschi.
Come le cinque dita di una mano – una famiglia di ebrei da Firenze a Gerusalemme (1998), Rizzoli. Written with her family.
Israele: una pace in guerra (1996), Il Mulino. (Israel, at peace in war)
Il Razzista Democratico (1990), Modadori.(The Democratic racist)

Notes

References

External links
Official website
Articles written on il Giornale 
Most recent articles by Fiamma Nirenstein from New York Sun

1945 births
Living people
20th-century Italian Jews
Activists against antisemitism
Italian magazine editors
Italian women editors
Politicians from Florence
Italian emigrants to Israel
Journalists from Florence
Italian women journalists
21st-century Italian Jews
Jewish women writers
Jewish journalists
Jewish women politicians
Zionists
20th-century Italian women
21st-century Italian women